Greenwood is a township in Gombak District, Selangor, Malaysia. It is located halfway between Batu Caves and Gombak town. Greenwood is sandwiched between the MRR2's interchanges with DUKE  and LPT .

Public transportation
 KTM Batu Caves and  LRT Gombak.

Gombak District
Townships in Selangor